Waggy may refer to:

Waggy, West Virginia, a former community
"Waggy", a Blink-182 song from Dude Ranch (album) and They Came to Conquer... Uranus EP

"Waggy", nickname of Danni Wyatt (born 1991), English cricketer